No Exit, also known as Sinners Go to Hell, is a 1962 American-Argentine dramatic film adaptation of Jean-Paul Sartre's play No Exit directed by Tad Danielewski. The film stars Morgan Sterne, Viveca Lindfors and Rita Gam.

Plot
The Valet (Manuel Rosón) enters a hotel room with Joseph Garcin (Morgan Sterne) in tow. The windowless room has a single entrance and no mirrors. Two women, Inès Serrano (Viveca Lindfors) and Estelle Rigault (Rita Gam), are then led in; afterwards, the Valet leaves and locks the door. Realizing that they are in hell, the trio expects to be tortured; however, no torturer is forthcoming. While waiting, they strike up a conversation and discuss each other's sins, desires, and unpleasant memories; they slowly realize that such probing is the form of torture they are meant to receive.

It later becomes apparent that Joseph, once a journalist, was executed for cowardice and the betrayal of the French Resistance. Estelle, who has a voracious sexual appetite, was a gold digger and seductress who killed a man. Meanwhile, the lesbian Inès abused her partner's love for her and eventually killed them both in a murder-suicide. As the story progresses, Garcin becomes increasingly annoyed by Inès' considering him a coward, while Estelle makes unreciprocated advances on him; Inès is tempted by Estelle, but crazed by Estelle's heterosexuality.

The three at first continue to see events happening on Earth, but eventually, as the living move on, they are left with only their own thoughts and the company of the other two. Towards the end of the film, Garcin demands he be let out; in response, the door opens. However, none leave. They resign themselves to their fate.

Production
Sartre did not know about the film while it was in production. Viveca Lindfors, at the time married to screenwriter George Tabori, was chosen to play Inès.

Style
The film uses dialogue-free flashbacks when the main characters talk about their lives. Alison Darren in the Lesbian Film Guide notes that Inès is a "typical screen lesbian" of the early 1960s, both physically attractive and inherently evil.

Release and reception
After being screened at the 12th Berlin International Film Festival in June 1962, where Rita Gam and Viveca Lindfors shared the Silver Bear for Best Actress award, No Exit received its American release on December 5.

Bosley Crowther, writing for The New York Times, found the film "antiseptic", with emotionless acting and stagy directing; he summarized that the film "prove[d] that "No Exit" is inappropriate material for a full-length [film]". Allison Darren calls the film an "excellent psychological drama" with a "surprisingly overt" depiction of lesbianism.

See also
Huis clos (1954)

References

Bibliography

External links
 

1962 films
1962 drama films
English-language Argentine films
Films directed by Tad Danielewski
American black-and-white films
Argentine black-and-white films
American films based on plays
Argentine films based on plays
Remakes of French films
American remakes of French films
1960s English-language films